Titus Clodius Pupienus Pulcher Maximus (c. 195 – aft. 224/226 or aft. 235 AD) was a Roman politician.

Life
He was appointed consul suffectus in the nundinium of 224 or 226, or perhaps of July 235.

Titius Clodius was the son of Pupienus, later Emperor, and wife Sextia Cethegilla. He married Tineia, the daughter of Quintus Tineius Sacerdos and Volusia Laodice. Together they had a son, Lucius Clodius Tineius Pupienus Bassus.

Family tree

References

Sources
 Christian Settipani. Continuité gentilice et continuité sénatoriale dans les familles sénatoriales romaines à l'époque impériale, 2000

External links 
 

Suffect consuls of Imperial Rome
3rd-century Romans
190s births
3rd-century deaths
Year of birth uncertain
Year of death unknown
Pulcher Maximus, Tiberius Pupienus
Pupieni
Sons of Roman emperors